Buôn Kuốp Hydroelectric Power Station is a 280MW hydroelectric power plant on the Vietnamese section of the Srepok River in Đắk Lắk Province, Vietnam.

See also

List of power stations in Vietnam

References

Hydroelectric power stations in Vietnam
Buildings and structures in Đắk Lắk province
Dams in Vietnam